Interest in the Architecture of Las Vegas began in the late 1960s, when in 1967 architects Robert Venturi and Denise Scott Brown traveled to the city accompanied by students in order to study its architecture.  They wrote, with Steven Izenour, a report in 1972 on the subject entitled Learning From Las Vegas: the Forgotten Symbolism of Architectural Form.  This report, and its thesis that Las Vegas showed the way for architecture in the late 20th century, drew the attention of the architectural world to the city.  A quarter of a century later, for a BBC program (a segment of The Late Show entitled "Virtually Las Vegas" broadcast on BBC Two on 1995-01-16) Venturi and Scott Brown revisited the city, and revised their opinions.

Initial thesis

In the 1970s, Venturi et al. observed that the city had then been structured around the automotive culture that was dominant at the time, with all of the buildings oriented towards the highway.  It was the norm for buildings to have "rhetorical front and conventional behind", in other words a decorated façade visible from the highway but a less decorative aspect where not visible.  The casinos and motels also sported ground-level parking at the front, between the building and the highway, a feature that Venturi considered to be distinctive.  They also drew a contrast between the artificially lit and air conditioned interiors of the buildings and the heat and glare of the "agoraphobic auto-scaled desert"  outside.  The mixture of styles, ranging from what they termed "Miami Moroccan" to "Yamasaki Bernini cum Roman Orgiastic" , they did not view as chaotic but rather as a necessary result of Las Vegas as one of what they termed "the world's 'pleasure zones'" alongside the likes of Marienbad, the Alhambra, Disneyland, and Xanadu and its positioning as a place where a visitor with an ordinary life could indulge in escapist notions of being "a centurion at Caesar's Palace, a ranger at The Frontier, or a jetsetter at the Riviera"  for a few days.

1990s revision

In the 1990s, Venturi and Scott Brown observed that the automotive-driven architecture of the 1960s had been transformed into a more pedestrianized form, in part as a result of the growth in visitors that it had experienced over the years.  The distinctive neon lighting, that in the 1960s had had Venturi et al. talking of Vegas as a city of signs, had been replaced by giant television screens, which Venturi bemoaned.  In their original book, and in the later 1977 revised edition, they had focussed upon characterizing Vegas in terms of how most if not all built objects in the (then) city in one way or another functioned as signage.  In the 1990s, Mark C. Taylor opined that the similarities between Disney and Las Vegas that Venturi et al. had touched upon in the 1970s had grown immensely over the years, with much of the urban space being thematized and devoted to fantasies upon fantasies and "worlds within worlds".  He observed that this architectural link to Disney had even been made concrete, with the MGM Grand Hotel directly mimicking (albeit with some differences) the original Walt Disney World.

Taylor also observed the replacement of neon with the televisual, to create a vast visual space in which "the virtual becomes real and the real becomes virtual".  As an example of this he propounded new Fremont Street, where "city planners have converted the train terminal that was inspired by the glass architecture of Parisian arcades, into a computer terminal", with a  canopy comprising 1.4 million computer-controlled lights and lasers.

References

Cross-reference

Sources used

Further reading 
 
 
 
 
 
 

Architecture of the Las Vegas Valley